Guyanancistrus teretirostris is a species of catfish in the family Loricariidae. It is a freshwater fish native to South America, where it occurs in the upper Paru de Oeste River in Brazil. The species reaches 9.8 cm (3.9 inches) in standard length. Its specific epithet, teretirostris, is derived from Latin and refers to the rounded shape of the species' snout.

References 

Fish described in 2018
Freshwater fish of Brazil
Catfish of South America
Fish of Brazil
Hypostominae